Welshpool High School is located in Welshpool, Powys. It is a combined secondary school and sixth form, catering for pupils aged 11 to 19. In 2022, a new headteacher was appointed.

Motto and the school
The school's motto is Raising Achievement By Raising Expectations. It was described as "A very good school with many outstanding features" in a 2004 Estyn report. The school was rated "Good" in a 2017 Estyn report. The same inspection report noted that school attendance was 'in the upper 50% of similar schools and that number of five GCSE grades at A*-A has been above average for similar schools in two of the last three years.

AstroTurf
Welshpool High School has an AstroTurf pitch used throughout the year for sporting events. It is flood-lit, and cost about £450,000 to build. It is used by both the school and public.

5x60
The school had a 5x60 scheme, where the children were offered extracurricular activities. There were lunchtime activities such as basketball, dodgeball, and other activities.

This program ended in 2018 upon the 5x60 officer leaving.

Sixth form
The secondary school has a sixth form. A 'leadership team' of a head boy, head girl and 4 deputies are elected from the year 13 each year, with roles such as improving teacher-pupil relations, organizing charity events and the annual 6th form Dinner Dance.

Campuses
The school itself is made of six 'blocks' (campuses). Each 'block' is for a different subject. The A Block is for maths; the B Block is for science and P.E; the C Block is for Modern Foreign Languages; The D Block is for English, art,  drama, D.T & music; the E Block is for learning support and; the F Block is for humanities.

References

External links

Secondary schools in Powys
Welshpool